CSS 4 can be:

 The most recent generation of the Cascading Style Sheets specification
 A Chinese intercontinental ballistic missile, more commonly known as DF-5, but also as CSS-4.